Kukah (also Romanized as Kūkah, Kookeh, and Kūkeh) is a village in Khorram Dasht Rural District, Kamareh District, Khomeyn County, Markazi Province, Iran. At the 2006 census, its population was 286, in 77 families.

References 

Populated places in Khomeyn County